The Principe scops owl (Otus bikegila) is a species of scops owl found only on Príncipe Island of São Tomé and Príncipe, an island country in the Gulf of Guinea off the coast of Africa. First noticed by its distinctive nighttime call, it was formally described in 2022. Given its low population numbers and tiny range, researchers have asked the IUCN to declare it Critically Endangered.

Call

The bird's call has been described as "tuu," repeated quickly, sometimes in duets. The birds begin to call almost as soon as it gets dark.

Etymology
The owl's Latin name was given in honor of park ranger and former parrot harvester Ceciliano "Bikegila" do Bom Jesus.

References

Otus (bird)
Birds described in 2022
Endemic birds of São Tomé and Príncipe